In the ancien Régime French Navy, officiers de plume (literally pen officers) were officers working in the administration of ports and colonies, as opposed to officiers d'épée, who were officers at sea.  These were the two principal corps of the French navy up until the 18th century.

Since the institution of class (maritime conscription), a third corps was instituted: the corps of "officiers des classes", in charge of recruiting sailors to man the king's naval vessels.  Also, the old galley corps (corps des galères) existed up until 1748, with its own administrators - thus one would not confuse a commissaire ordinaire of the galleys, who would be a member of the galley corps, with a commissaire ordinaire of the navy, who would be a member of the corps de plume.  Up to the 17th century, a corps of naval artillery officers had existed, but this was abolished at the start of the 18th century.

Sources
Asselinm Jean-François, Le corps des officiers de plume dans la marine royale au XVIIIe siècle à travers l'étude de l'arsenal de Rochefort, Mémoire de maîtrise, dirigé par Michel Vergé-Franceschi. Paris IV-Sorbonne, 2000. 

Military ranks of France
Navy of the Ancien Régime